Menaceur is a small town and commune in Algeria, situated about 100 km west of Algiers. Menaceur has a population of 40,000. The Bouchanoun River passes through Menaceur. Nearby mountains include Zabrir, el Pic, Boumaad, and Tizi Franco.

History
Menaceur is known for its fight against French colonization. Tizi Franco, where French troops were ambushed in 1957, deeply influenced French army tactics in the region.

1 - Introduction

Following the example of resistance, popular uprisings and revolts that marked the nineteenth century and encompassed various parts of Algeria, the resistance of Beni Menaceur, Miliana and Cherchell between July 14 and August 21, 1871 was the One of the links in the chain revolts. Like all revolutions that preceded it, it was underpinned by the causes and circumstances which, although they were mostly particular, remain virtually unchanged. 2 - Because of the resistance of Beni Menaceur Among the main reasons that prompted the outbreak of the revolt, is the policy of colonialism French based on injustice, oppression, repression and the plundering of private and public property, along with the adoption by the French authorities of the policy of "divide and conquer" in an attempt to reconcile the benevolence of some families which it entrusted the mission to look after its interests at the expense of the majority of residents. In this region, the colonial authorities were able to create from scratch a conflict between two Algerian families: on the one hand that of Brahim Sa'îd ibn Mohammed El Ghobrini, which was one of the families from the outset collaborated with the authorities Tenure and taken up arms against the Titteri Bey and the Bey Boumezrag and another family of El Berkani whose stronghold was located Miliana and which was headed by Sheikh al Malek ibn al Berkani Sahraoui, nephew Mohammed Ben Aissa el Berkani, khalifa (*) The Emir Abdelkader in Titteri. Following France's policy, the two families went down in a bloody conflict all that the family commissioned an El Berkani eastern part of Beni Menaceur, something that El Ghobrini the family did not accept. To this should be added the suffering of the people of Cherchell Miliana and as a result of the colonial policy based on the forced collection of taxes, which drain resources and damage to their most sacred values in matters of religion. 3 - Steps resistance Beni Ménaceur The first spark of resistance springs on April 30, 1871 when the colonial authorities undertook to provoke the people by ordering gang bosses that they were subjected to collect the taxes without taking into account the tragic conditions of the inhabitants. Residents expressed their refusal by hunting with stones agents of colonialism. -- 1 - First step: The chouyouks (*) of Beni Menaceur found it necessary to hold an extraordinary meeting to discuss the social and economic situation in the region arising from the French policy. On May 6, 1871 was the date fixed for the meeting to kubba (*) of the saint Sidi Ahmed Benyoucef, near the region of Souk el Had.

The meeting s'achev on the decision, as a first step, to assassinate gang bosses allied to France. All present agreed on the need to eliminate El Mouloud El Habbouchi, regarded as the man in the hand of France in the region. However, France, rightly fearing the reaction of people worked to get his resignation and he was replaced on 20 May 187, by Mohammed Said El Ghobrini, which was on the list of people to be slaughtered and prepared by the participants of the meeting, May 6, 1871. The designation of the latter provoked discontent and anger of the people whose chouyoukhs met again on 28 and 29 June 1871 for agreeing to assassinate Said El Ghobrini. However, the chairman of the bureau Arabic, Mr VARLOUD, prevented this by the appointment of a new caïd, namely Mouloud El Ben Abidi, who was also rejected because he did not belong to the region of Beni Menasra . But the Governor General De Gueydon maintained his decision to appoint Ben El Mouloud, which ratcheted up the discontent of the people against this policy.

-2 - The second stage

Lassés of politics Governor General De Gueydon, residents of Beni Menaceur decided to move to the crucial stage of the battle, July 13, 1871. The starting point was the region Théniet el Had, and the movement spread to the villages and causing dechras popular support. Ben Abidi and Mouloud El Said El Ghobrini quickly to inform the colonial authorities of this popular movement and what happened at the meeting at which the decision was taken revolutionary. This enabled the French authorities to take measures to cope with the events.

-3 - Third stage

It was imperative for the elders and chouyoukhs of Beni Menaceur to take steps as soon as possible in order not to lose the leadership of the business and provide an opportunity for the occupation authorities to nip in the bud the revolt. To this end, it was agreed to appoint Sheikh Malek El Berkani, as leader after the betrayal of El Ghobrini and Ben Mouloud El was proved. The title of agha fighters he was awarded and the troops were divided into three groups:

-- The main group headed by Malek El Berkani, assisted by his brother and Brahim Mustapha ibn Mohammed Oudjelloul Abdelmalek and was given the task to head on Cherchell, headquarters of the occupation authority and the attack.

-- A second group, called Beni Menaceur East, the command was given to Oukerjouj Ali ibn Ahmed, a friend of El Berkani and that was one of the prominent leaders of the revolt, was instructed to head for the region Zourikh .
-- A third group, called Blessed Ménaceur West whose command was given to Ahmed Ouddadi, attended by heads of douars and dechras and was to head for the region Noufi. This step was also characterized by the letters sent by El Berkani Malek, head of the revolt, in many areas, to encourage them to undertake the holy war against infidels. He obtained and the rallying of Kaddour Ben El Moubarek of Koléa and Abdelkader Ben El Mokhtar of Miliana, two strong personalities whose rallying gave a new impetus to revolt, and allowed the fighters to carry out numerous attacks against the enemy and its allies July 17, 1871. Indeed, they faced a troupe led military VARLOUD Captain in the region of Noufi. From there, they headed towards Hadjout, burned the hotel Hammam Righa and killed many French. Faced with the growing phenomenon of revolts and their intensification, the French authorities were forced to send additional troops to Koléa under the command of Colonel DESANDRE. However, these reinforcements n'entamèrent not the determination of fighters led by El Berkani since managed to extend the revolt in the region of Hadjout, coming to the ends of the Capital. During this stage, the revolt recorded many victories against the French and their allies. So on July 23, a number of settlers were killed and burned their factories including a mill and oil, along with fires farms settlers and their plantations erected at the expense of local residents. The day of July 25, 1871 was characterized by attacks by fighters against the troops. This day also took place at the Battle of Bellagh Oued, near Mount Chenoua, at the end of which the combatants were victorious, and they managed to cut water supply to the City of Cherchell and burn some farms of settlers whose firm Nicolas.
4 - Consequences of Resistance of Beni Menaceur

The French authorities acquired the conviction that to deal with this uprising, intensified its military presence was necessary. To this end, order was given to its land and sea forces attacking hotbeds of revolt. They came so Miliana, Algiers and Béjaïa under the command of the officer PONSARK. In addition, the French troops led by the officer BOUSQUET, and supported by the escort LAVISO-KLEBER and did DESAX route to the affected areas. From this imbalance in the balance of power, it resulted: -- The death on the field of honour of the leader Malek El Berkani on 2 August 1871 during a battle near the region Zourikh. -- The destruction of the zaouia El Berkani at Miliana. -- The succession of his brother Ibrahim at the head of the revolt he continued committing several battles between 19 and August 20. -- The surrender of the latter on August 21, 1871, which put an end to the revolt. -- The families of the rebels were subjected to severe penalties, including the confiscation of their land, the destruction of their homes, the burning of their property and judgement of many of them by the courts martial and their sentences ranging from life imprisonment with forced labor and deportation.

Made by: Brehim Hendi

References

Geography of Algeria
Cities in Algeria
Algeria